Events from the year 1873 in Ireland.

Events
February – Irish Home Rule Movement: Home Rule Confederation of Great Britain founded in Manchester.
March – Gladstone's Irish University Bill defeated in the House of Commons.
May 4 – the Roman Catholic St Eugene's Cathedral, Derry, is dedicated.
November 18–21 – Irish Home Rule Movement: The Home Government Association reconstitutes itself as the Home Rule League.

Arts and literature

Sport
 October – foundation of County Carlow Football Club, Rugby Union Club

Births
9 January – John Flanagan, three-time Olympic gold medalist in the hammer throw (died 1938).
17 January – T. C. Murray, dramatist (died 1959).
27 January – Alexander Young, soldier, recipient of the Victoria Cross for gallantry in 1901 at Ruiterskraal, South Africa, killed in action (died 1916).
1 February – John Barry, soldier, posthumous recipient of the Victoria Cross for gallantry in 1901 at Monument Hill, South Africa (died 1901).
20 March – Cecil Lowry-Corry, 6th Earl Belmore, High Sheriff and councillor (died 1949).
29 March (bapt.) – Peig Sayers (Máiréad Sayers), seanchaí (traditional storyteller) (died 1958).
 30 March – William Lyle, 1940s Member of the House of Commons of Northern Ireland for Queen's University of Belfast (died 1949)
19 April – Thomas Crean, recipient of the Victoria Cross for gallantry in 1901 at Tygerkloof Spruit, South Africa (died 1923).
5 May – Lucius Gwynn, cricketer (died 1902).
18 May – J. B. Fagan, actor-manager (died 1933 in Hollywood)
28 May – D. D. Sheehan, journalist, barrister, author, Irish Parliamentary Party MP, one of four MP's to serve in 16th (Irish) Division in World War I (died 1948).
3 June – Sir John Keane, 5th Baronet, barrister, member of Seanad (died 1956).
14 June – William Parsons, 5th Earl of Rosse, soldier (died 1918).
22 July James Cousins, poet and writer (died 1956).
6 August – James O'Mara, Irish Parliamentary Party and Sinn Féin MP (died 1948).
2 September – James Duhig, Archbishop of Roman Catholic Archdiocese of Brisbane (died 1965).
26 September – Annie M. P. Smithson, nurse, novelist, poet and Nationalist (died 1948).
30 October – Dave Gallaher, rugby player for New Zealand, killed at the Battle of Passchendaele (died 1917).
26 November – Tom Sharkey, boxer (died 1953).
5 December – William Crozier, cricketer (died 1916).
9 December – James McCombs, politician in New Zealand (died 1933).
12 December – Lola Ridge, anarchist poet and editor (died 1941).

Deaths
Early – Master McGrath, greyhound (born 1866).
7 February – Sheridan Le Fanu, novelist (born 1814).
20 February – James Haughton, social reformer and temperance activist (born 1795).
28 March – John Watts, military officer, architect in Australia (born 1786).
30 March – Richard Church, soldier, military officer and general in the Greek Army (born 1784).
8 April – Charles Irwin, soldier, recipient of the Victoria Cross for gallantry in 1857 at Lucknow, India (born 1824).

References

External links
 County|Carlow Football Club

 
1870s in Ireland
Ireland
Years of the 19th century in Ireland
 Ireland